Horley railway station serves the town of Horley in Surrey, England. It is on the Brighton Main Line,  down the line from  via , and train services are provided by Thameslink and Southern.

History 
The present Horley station is in fact the second in the town. The first station was designed by David Mocatta and was on a larger scale than other intermediate stations on the line. Horley was situated almost midway between London and Brighton, and was chosen for the erection of the London and Brighton Railway carriage sheds and repair workshops. These were later moved to Brighton railway works. The station was enlarged in 1862 by addition of a second storey to the building. A canopy and footbridge were added in 1884.

The current Horley station opened 31 December 1905, to coincide with the quadrupling of the railway line by the London Brighton and South Coast Railway. The original station then became the Station Master's house and survived until the 1960s.

In the 1870s William Stroudley considered moving the locomotive works to Horley but was persuaded to keep them in Brighton. Nevertheless, the sidings at Horley were used for storing withdrawn locomotives and those awaiting repair until the First World War.

The Thameslink Programme turned over some of the Southern services over to the expanded Thameslink network currently operated by Govia Thameslink Railway.

Facilities

Concourse
Ticket Office (1 Window)
Quick Ticket
Café
Waiting Room (x2)
Telephone
Toilet (Unisex)
Car Park (x2)

Services
Off-peak, all services at Horley are operated by Thameslink using  EMUs.

The typical off-peak service in trains per hour is:
 2 tph to  via 
 2 tph to 
 2 tph to Three Bridges 
 2 tph to 

In addition, faster peak hour services towards Littlehampton now stop at the station.

During the night, the station is served by an hourly Thameslink service between Three Bridges and Bedford (not calling at London Bridge). This service runs on Sunday-Friday nights with an hourly Southern service to London Victoria on Saturday nights.

Although the station is outside Greater London, Oyster Pay as you go and contactless payment cards are valid. However, the station is outside the London Fare Zone area and as a result, special fares apply.

References

External links

Railway stations in Surrey
Former London, Brighton and South Coast Railway stations
Railway stations in Great Britain opened in 1905
Railway stations served by Govia Thameslink Railway
1905 establishments in England
David Mocatta railway stations
Horley